Pamelia Stickney (formerly known as Pamelia Kurstin) is an American theremin player. She has performed and recorded with many artists including David Byrne, Yoko Ono, Béla Fleck and the Flecktones, David Garland, Seb Rochford, Otto Lechner and Simone Dinnerstein, and was instrumental to the final design of Robert Moog's Etherwave Pro Theremin, for which she was the primary test musician. Kurstin has made various film, television and radio appearances, most notably on Saturday Night Live.  and in the 2004 documentary Moog.

Stickney has also presented talks at events such as TED. Her background as a jazz musician on the upright bass has led to develop a "walking bass" theremin technique. She was based in New York until 2005; she now lives in Vienna, Austria.

Stickney was first introduced to the theremin during production of the album Into the Oh in 1999 by Luaka Bop duo Geggy Tah – singer/writer Tommy Jordan and keyboardist Greg Kurstin. She recorded Gymnopedie in 2000 as a member of the theremin/keyboard duo called "The Kurstins" with her then-husband, Greg. Her first solo album Thinking Out Loud was released in 2007 on John Zorn's Tzadik label. In 2011 the London-based label Slowfoot released Ouch Evil Slow Hop, a collaboration between Pamelia and Seb Rochford.

In 2013, Stickney formed Blueblut  with Mark Holub and Chris Janka. The Vienna-based trio released their first album hurts so gut on Bandcamp in 2014.

Discography
Albums
2007: Thinking Out Loud 
2013: Promotional Copy
2017: Transcendental Dissonance 
Collaborations
2020: Vulneraries Vol. 5 (with David and Kenji Garland, credited to The Garlands with Pamelia Stickney)
2011: Ouch Evil Slow Hop (with Sebastian Rochford)
2011: Tunisia (with Pat Mastelotto)
2011: Besides Feldman (with Patrick Pulsinger)Hilary Jeffery)and Rozemarie Heggen
2000: First Visit (with Gerry Gibbs and the Third Trio from the Sun, featuring Gerry Gibbs and Greg Kurstin)
Blueblut
2014: hurts so gut
2016: buttbutt

References

External links

 Official site
 Blueblut Bandcamp site
 
 TED Talk: The untouchable music of the theremin (TED2002)
 

American electronic musicians
Theremin players
1976 births
Living people
American women in electronic music